John Bertalot (born 1931) is an English  organist, who served at Blackburn Cathedral and Trinity Church, Princeton.

Background
John Bertalot was born in Maidstone, Kent on 15 September 1931.

He studied organ at the Royal College of Music and was then organ scholar of Corpus Christi College, Cambridge from 1955 - 1958.

He is the author of 
"John Bertalot's immediately practical tips for choral directors"
"Five Wheels to Successful Sight-singing: A Practical Approach to Teach Children and Adults to Read Music"
"How to be a Successful Choir Director"

Career
Organist of:
St Matthew's Church, Northampton 1958 - 1964
Blackburn Cathedral 1964 - 1983
Trinity Church, Princeton 1983 - 1998

External links
Personal Website

References

English classical organists
British male organists
Cathedral organists
1931 births
Alumni of the Royal College of Music
Alumni of Corpus Christi College, Cambridge
Living people
People from Maidstone
Musicians from Kent
21st-century organists
21st-century British male musicians
20th-century organists
20th-century British male musicians
20th-century British musicians
20th-century English musicians
21st-century English musicians
Male classical organists